Serge Golon (born Vsevolod Sergeevich Golubinov, ; 23 August 1903 – 12 July 1972) was a French geochemist and artist of Russian descent. He is known as the husband of French author Anne Golon, author the Angélique series.

Biography 
Golon was a Russian aristocrat, born in Bukhara, Turkestan; his father was the tsar's consul in Isfahan.

In 1920, he emigrated from Constantinople to France.

In the 1940s, he worked in the French Congo, Africa, led the cement and tanneries, and worked on the gold mine. He met Simone Changeux (known as Anne) there and returned to France with her. They had four children together, one of whom is the biochemist and author Pierre Goloubinoff.

In 1954, he and his wife released a memoir about their stay in Africa titled . They also collaborated on the popular Angélique novel series set in the 17th century, with Golon providing historical research.

In 1961, he began painting. In 1968, he held his first solo art exhibition in Crans-Montana, Switzerland.

In 1972, Golon and his wife travelled to Quebec, Canada, to research their latest Angélique novel. He passed away from a heart attack there.

References

1903 births
1972 deaths
Emigrants from the Russian Empire to France
French male writers
People from Bukhara
Russian nobility
White Russian emigrants to France
20th-century French male writers